Latynina is a surname. Notable people with the surname include: 

 Alla Latynina (born 1940), Russian literary critic
 Larisa Latynina (born 1934), Soviet gymnast
 Yulia Latynina (born 1966), Russian writer and journalist

Russian-language surnames